Air India Flight 245  was a scheduled Air India passenger flight from Bombay to London via Cairo and Geneva. On the morning of 3 November 1950, the Lockheed L-749A Constellation serving the flight crashed into Mont Blanc, France, while approaching Geneva.  All 48 aboard were killed.

The plane operating the flight was a named Malabar Princess, registered VT-CQP. It was piloted by Captain Alan R. Saint, 34, and co-pilot V. Y. Korgaokar and was carrying 40 passengers and 8 crew. While over France, descending towards Geneva Airport, the flight crashed into the French Alps in stormy weather, killing all on board.

Accident
Stormy weather prevented immediate rescue efforts; debris was located by a Swiss plane on 5 November, and rescue parties reached the site two days later. There were no survivors. The last transmission from the aircraft, received by controllers at Grenoble and Geneva, was "I am vertical with Voiron, at 4700 meters altitude." at 10:43 a.m.

Some mail on board the flight was recovered after the crash and was annotated with "Retardé par suite d'accident aerien" ("delayed due to aviation accident"); further items of mail were found in 1951 and 1952. On 8 June 1978, a patrol of the French mountain police found letters and a sack at the foot of the Bossons Glacier. Recovered were 57 envelopes and 55 letters (without envelopes) and all but eight letters were forwarded to their original addressees. 

Sixteen years after the crash, Air India Flight 101 crashed in almost exactly the same spot under similar circumstances. In September 2013, a climber discovered a cache of jewelry that is believed to have been aboard one of these two flights.

References

Airliner accidents and incidents with an unknown cause
Aviation accidents and incidents in France
Aviation accidents and incidents in 1950
Accidents and incidents involving the Lockheed Constellation
Mont Blanc
245
1950 in France
November 1950 events in Europe